The Pacific Design Center, or PDC, is a  multi-use facility for the design community located in West Hollywood, California. One of the buildings is often described as the Blue Whale because of its large size relative to surrounding buildings and its brilliant blue glass cladding.

Site and Brief
The PDC houses the West Coast's top decorating and furniture market, with showrooms, public and private spaces and used to host a branch of the Museum of Contemporary Art (MOCA). The Center has 100 showrooms which display and sell 2,200 interior product lines to professional interior designers, architects, facility managers, decorators and dealers.

The Pacific Design Center hosts many screenings, exhibitions, lectures, meetings, special events and receptions for the design, entertainment and arts communities. The annual Elton John AIDS Foundation Academy Award Party has traditionally been held at the PDC. The party is one of the longest running and best known of the post-Oscar parties as well as being a multimillion-dollar fundraiser for the foundation.

The interior of one floor of the Blue Whale, and the escalators of the same building, are used extensively as the underground workshops for the Westworld TV series.

Architecture
Designed by Argentine architect César Pelli, the  campus opened in 1975, with the  Center Blue. Architect Norma Merrick Sklarek also contributed to the architectural design of the building. Center Green opened in 1988, adding . The final phase of the plan, Center Red, opened in 2013 with an additional .

Gallery

References

External links

MOCA Pacific Design Center

Commercial buildings in Los Angeles
Art in Greater Los Angeles
Landmarks in Los Angeles
Buildings and structures in Los Angeles County, California
1975 establishments in California
César Pelli buildings
Modernist architecture in California
Tourist attractions in Los Angeles County, California
Buildings and structures in West Hollywood, California
Shopping malls established in 1975